Jonas Šimėnas (31 July 1953 – 15 March 2023) was a Lithuanian politician. In 1990 he was among those who signed the Act of the Re-Establishment of the State of Lithuania.

Šimėnas died on 15 March 2023, at the age of 69.

References

Sources
 Biography 

1953 births
2023 deaths
Members of the Seimas
21st-century Lithuanian politicians
People from Anykščiai District Municipality
Vilnius University alumni